This is a list of postage stamps issued by the India Post between 2005 and 2009.

2005

2006

2007

2008

2009

See also
 List of postage stamps of India
 List of Miniature Sheets from India Post
 Postage stamps and postal history of India

References

 Anon. (2008). Phila India 2008 Guide book (1800-2007).
 Anon. (2008). List of stamps (Year 1852 to 2007). Chief Postmaster General, Maharashtra Circle, Mumbai 400001.

External links
 Indian Postage Stamps
 Stamps of the World Wiki Catalog
 Welcome to the World of Indian Philately

Postage stamps of India
India2005